Rocklin station is an Amtrak California train station in Rocklin, California, United States.

History
The city and the Placer County Transportation Planning Agency funded the design and construction of the current $1.25 million depot, which opened in July 2006. Designed by Studio SMS of nearby Roseville and inspired by historic 19th and early 20th century stations, the depot is dominated by a clock tower. The building is finished in a random ashlar stone veneer in varying shades of grey and beige and stucco with complementary brown tones.

In 2019 Rocklin was the 52nd-busiest of Amtrak's 73 California stations, boarding or detraining an average of about 47 passengers daily.

Design
The depot has a waiting room for rail and bus passengers, and there are also offices for the Rocklin Area Chamber of Commerce as well as a room reserved for community meetings.

Platforms and tracks

References

External links

Rocklin Amtrak Station (USA RailGuide -- TrainWeb)

Amtrak stations in Placer County, California
Railway stations in the United States opened in 2006